The 21st Scripps National Spelling Bee was held in Washington, District of Columbia on May 28, 1948, hosted by the E.W. Scripps Company. The winner was 14-year old Jean Chappelear of Ohio, correctly spelling the word psychiatry.

Second place went to 14-year-old Darrell Flavelle of Washington, D.C., who misspelled "oligarchy", followed by Rosemary Schirmer of White Oak, Ohio who took third after missing "ecclesiastical". Both Chappellear and Flavelle missed "poncho" and "termagant" before the end. Chappellear held a "lucky penny" throughout the contest. 

There were 40 contestants ages 11–14, and it ran longer than any prior bees, with a total of 593 words used.

Chappelear was the fourth Akron, Ohio based speller to win the Bee.  Jean Ann (Chappelear) Schlupe died in Ohio on February 23, 2021.

References

Scripps National Spelling Bee competitions
Scripps National Spelling Bee
Scripps National Spelling Bee
Scripps National Spelling Bee
Scripps National Spelling Bee